Cindy Agidius is an American politician who served as a member of the Idaho House of Representatives for the 5A district from 2012 to 2014.

Early life and education 
Agidius was born in Spokane, Washington. Agidius grew up in Wallace, Idaho, graduating from Wallace High School. She attended the University of Idaho.

Career 
Agidius was a realtor in Moscow, Idaho. She was also a staffer for United States Senators Dirk Kempthorne and Mike Crapo.

Agidius is a member of the Latah County Board of Realtors and the Moscow Chamber of Commerce. She was the state director of the Idaho Women's Commission during Kempthorne's tenure as governor.

On November 6, 2012, Agidius won the election and became a Republican member of Idaho House of Representatives for District 5 seat A. Agidius defeated Paulette Jordan with 50.3% of the votes. On November 4, 2014 Agidius was defeated for re-election by Paulette Jordan with 51.8% of the votes.

After her defeat from the House of Representatives, Agidius was hired by the Idaho House Republican Caucus as its communications director for the 2015 legislative session. House Minority Leader John Rusche of Lewiston asked Speaker Scott Bedke for her removal from the position, alleging that Agidius was abusing her role as communications director by 'harassing' and 'spying' on her former opponent, Representative Paulette Jordan. Agidius took a photograph of Jordan swiveling in her chair when U.S. Senator Jim Risch addressed the Idaho House of Representatives, which Agidius saw as disrespectful, and criticized Jordan on Facebook for missing a committee vote on a concealed weapons bill, a comment which was later removed. Agidius remained as communications director and responded to the allegations, "In my opinion, a problem never existed. I have enough to do here without worrying about what Paulette's doing. There have been a few instances when I've seen her do things she said she wouldn't do. Those are things I may store and remember, if I choose to run again." Agidius did not challenge Jordan in 2016.

Personal life 
Agidius and her husband, Paul, have four children. Agidius and her family live in Moscow, Idaho.

Elections

References

External links
 Lucinda L. Agidius at the Idaho Legislature
 Campaign site
 Biography at Ballotpedia
 Financial information (state office) at the National Institute for Money in State Politics

Year of birth missing (living people)
Living people
Republican Party members of the Idaho House of Representatives
People from Moscow, Idaho
Politicians from Spokane, Washington
University of Idaho alumni
Women state legislators in Idaho
21st-century American women